West Forsyth High School is a high school in the Piedmont region of North Carolina.

General 
West Forsyth is located in Clemmons, a small suburb of Winston-Salem. Located between Interstate 40 and U.S. Route 421, the school mainly serves students of Clemmons with some students from Lewisville and Winston-Salem.

West Forsyth consistently scores highly on standardized tests. In 2007, it was ranked 356th in the Newsweek Top 1000 Best Schools in America. For the 2009–2010 school year, West Forsyth was the highest scoring high school in the county. It was also one of 13 North Carolina high schools in 2009 to receive the distinction of Honor School of Excellence due to high achievement on standardized tests. 

At West Forsyth High, students have the opportunity to take Advanced Placement course work and exams. The AP participation rate at West Forsyth High is 57 percent.

The student body is 50 percent male and 50 percent female, and the total minority enrollment is 37 percent.

West Forsyth High is one of 18 high schools in the Winston-Salem/Forsyth County Schools.

History 
West Forsyth was built in 1964 after the merger of the Winston-Salem School District and Forsyth County School District. It originally served as the new home for students of Southwest High School (now Southwest Elementary), which is located within walking distance from the campus.

In the beginning, only six buildings existed at West (100–600). The early 1970s brought several new additions, including the track, football stadium, and tennis courts. Five more buildings have been also been built. The 700 and 900 buildings were constructed in the early 1980s. The Harold B. Simpson Gymnasium, named after West's first principal, was also built during that time. The 1000 building, the only two-story building on campus, was constructed last, in the late 1990s. A new auditorium (Performing Arts Center) was constructed, replacing the old auditorium in the 600 building, which is now the band room. The 100, 200, 300, 400, and 500 buildings have been remodeled. Two PODS have been put in place as well, which house the school's Army JROTC program.  The total budget for the overall upgrading of the facility was $10.5 million. In 2022, the WSFCS school board approved the basketball court located in the Harold B. Simpson Gymnasium to be dedicated and renamed in honor to former student Chris Paul, the basketball court's name was changed to 'Chris Paul Court'.

Athletics 
West Forsyth is a member of the 4A Central Piedmont Conference (CPC). The CPC features many of West's rivals, including R.J. Reynolds, Davie County, and Robert B. Glenn High School; and its main rivals, East Forsyth High School and Reagan High School.

 Fall sports 	
Cross country (boys' and girls')
 Field hockey (girls') 	
 Football (varsity and junior varsity)
Golf (girls')
Soccer (boys') (varsity and junior varsity)
Tennis (girls')
Volleyball (girls') (varsity and junior varsity)
 Winter sports 	
 Basketball (boys' and girls') (varsity and junior varsity) 	
 Winter track 	
 Swimming & diving (boys' and girls') 	
 Wrestling (varsity and junior varsity) 	
 Spring sports 	
 Baseball (varsity and junior varsity) 	
 Golf (boys') 	
 Lacrosse (boys' and girls') (varsity and junior varsity) 	
 Soccer (girls') (varsity and junior varsity) 	
 Softball (varsity and junior varsity) 	
 Tennis (boys') 	
 Outdoor track (boys' and girls')

Extracurricular activities 
West Forsyth's music programs include chorus, orchestra and band classes. In choral music, West Forsyth's Concert Choir has received a superior rating at the North Carolina Music Educators Association State Festival every year for the past nine years.

In February 2017 the West Forsyth Army JROTC program scored a 99.5/100 on an inspection held every four years. This was among the highest scores in the entire country.

Notable alumni
 Tyrone Anthony  NFL running back
 LaQuanda Barksdale  WNBA player
 Norton Barnhill  NBA player
 Dale Folwell  current North Carolina State Treasurer and former Speaker pro tempore of the North Carolina House of Representatives
 Neal Hendrix  professional skateboarder
 Byron Hill  songwriter
 Alex McCalister  NFL and Canadian Football League linebacker
 Chris Paul  NBA player, 2-time Olympic gold medalist and former Wake Forest Demon Deacon
 Tab Thacker  actor and wrestler, won NCAA wrestling championship while at NC State
 Dustie Waring  rhythm guitarist for Between the Buried and Me

External links 
 West Forsyth High School official home page 	
 Winston-Salem / Forsyth County Schools home page
 West Forsyth High School Alumni Association

References 

1964 establishments in North Carolina
Educational institutions established in 1964
High schools in Winston-Salem, North Carolina
Public high schools in North Carolina